The 15th Legislature of the Third Portuguese Republic is the meeting of the Assembly of the Republic that was elected in the 2022 Portuguese legislative election.

List of members

References 

Assembly of the Republic (Portugal)
2022 establishments in Portugal
Assembly of the Republic of Portugal